is the acronym for Japan United Stores Company, a chain of "general merchandise stores" (or hypermarket) and the largest of its type in Japan.

The various JUSCO companies are subsidiaries of the ÆON supermarket chain.

The JUSCO name was adopted in 1970 from a company founded as a kimono silk trader in 1758. Renamed ÆON in 1989, it operates stores throughout Japan under JUSCO and other names and also has a presence in Malaysia, Hong Kong, mainland China and Thailand.

As of March 1, 2011, all JUSCO and SATY stores under the Aeon umbrella in Japan changed their names to AEON while all the JUSCO stores and shopping centres in Malaysia have been fully re-branded into AEON since March 2012. The Hong Kong and Mainland China subsidiaries officially changed their name to AEON on 1 March 2013.

History
In the 1970s, JUSCO was constituted by Mie Prefecture, Kyoto and Hyogo in Japan and was named Japan United Stores COmpany. (Shortened form JUSCO).  After that, it experienced rapid development. Currently there are about 300 stores in Japan itself and still counting.
The group was renamed AEON in 1990, but its retail stores were still using the old name JUSCO. In late 2010, AEON announced that all existing JUSCO stores in Japan would gradually be renamed AEON. The re-branding exercise began in March 2011 and was complete by the end of that year.

International ventures

Malaysia

In 1985, the first JUSCO store outside Japan was opened in Plaza Dayabumi, Kuala Lumpur, Malaysia, as a jointly-owned company with Cold Storage and three local companies, known as Jaya JUSCO. It was the first time that a Japanese company had entered into a significant joint venture in the Malaysian retail industry. JUSCO assumed total operational control of the chain in 1988. Currently. there are 62 AEON (formerly known as JUSCO) Retails stores and shopping centres are in operation in Malaysia.

The oldest (though not the first) JUSCO store in Malaysia is JUSCO Taman Maluri in Cheras, Kuala Lumpur. It opened on 30 October 1989.

JUSCO in Malaysia is notable for being among the first general merchandise chains to introduce biodegradable polybags made from sweet potatoes.

In March 2012, all the JUSCO stores and shopping centres in Malaysia were re-branded to AEON, following the decision of AEON in Japan.

In April 2018, AEON expanded to East Malaysia by opening their first mall in Kuching.

Hong Kong

The Hong Kong JUSCO subsidiary was established in November 1987 as JUSCO Department Store Co. Ltd. The first JUSCO store opened in Kornhill in December 1987 (another name for this store was Quarry Bay Main and Flagship store). It was listed in Hong Kong Exchanges and Clearing Limited on 4 February 1994 with the stock code 984.

Hong Kong JUSCO has now been renamed as AEON Stores (Hong Kong), and mainly manages shopping malls and other retail shops such as supermarkets, discount shops, home places, convenience stores and department stores. They offer low-cost and convenient daily necessities to customers including food, clothes, household items and electrical appliances. As of March 2013, there are eight AEON General Merchandise Stores (GMS) in Hong Kong, seven branches of AEON Supermarkets, 22 branches of Living Plaza by AEON, 4 branches of BENTO EXPRESS by AEON, 2 Aeon Style stores and only one branch of AEON MaxValu Prime, which is located at The One, Tsim Sha Tsui.

Taiwan
Taiwan JUSCO are subsidiaries of Taiwan AEON Stores Co., Ltd. The first JUSCO was in Windance in Hsinchu City. It was operated in 2003.  The second JUSCO was operated in December 2005 at New Taipei city global mall.

China

In Mainland China, JUSCO uses AEON and JUSCO for its name.  From 1996, AEON Co., Ltd created many shopping mall named JUSCO.  In Shanghai, there was a JUSCO before, but it divested finance finally because of poor management.  In Guangdong, Guangdong JUSCO Co., Ltd used the name "JUSCO" to operate the first JUSCO at 1996.  Now, there are thirteen shops in Guangdong.  Otherwise, AEON also operated large shopping mall in Beijing and Shunde.  It also planned to expand to North China. In Shenzhen, Aeon has  a number of large stores including one at Coastal city (Houhai station ).

Other countries
The largest JUSCO (also the largest single-building shopping center in Japan) opened in 2005 in Mito.

All but two JUSCOs, Srinakarin Rd and Sukhumvit Soi 71, have been closed down in Bangkok, Thailand. ÆON Co., Ltd. is re-expanding there under the MaxValu name instead.

References

External links

 ÆON Co., Ltd
 ÆON China Co., Ltd
 ÆON Stores (Hong Kong) Co.
 AEON Retail Malaysia Facebook Page
 AEON CO.(M) BHD
 Guandong Jusco Tianmao, China
 ÆON Jusco, Qingdao, China

Aeon Group
Retail companies established in 1970
Retail companies disestablished in 2013
Multinational companies headquartered in Japan
Supermarkets of Japan
Supermarkets of Taiwan
Department stores of Hong Kong
Supermarkets of Hong Kong
Supermarkets of China
Supermarkets of Malaysia
Department stores of Malaysia
Department stores of Thailand
1970 establishments in Japan